Lake Ercina is a small highland lake in Asturias, Spain. It is located in the Picos de Europa, in the Cantabrian Mountains. Situated next to Lake Enol, together, they forms the group known as Lakes of Covadonga within the Picos de Europa National Park. Lake Ercina is smaller than Lake Enol. Its characteristics are tied to its glacier origin and geographic location.

References

External links 

Picos de Europa
Ercina